Neil Wilkinson (born August 15, 1967) is a Canadian former professional ice hockey player. He was selected by the Minnesota North Stars in the second round (30th overall) of the 1986 NHL Entry Draft. He played in the National Hockey League between 1989 and 1999.

Playing career
He played for the Minnesota North Stars, San Jose Sharks, Chicago Blackhawks, Winnipeg Jets and Pittsburgh Penguins in the 1980s and 1990s. Wilkinson retired from professional hockey after the 1998-99 NHL season.

Retirement
Wilkinson remained retired for four seasons before making a brief return to the Central Hockey League in 2003 with the Tulsa Oilers and the ECHL's Fresno Falcons in 2004.

Wilkinson was inducted into the Manitoba Hockey Hall Of Fame on April 15, 2011.  Due to his aggressive style of play and body checks he was given the nickname Big Daddy

Career statistics

Regular season and playoffs

References

External links

1967 births
Living people
Canadian expatriate ice hockey players in the United States
Canadian ice hockey defencemen
Chicago Blackhawks players
Cleveland Lumberjacks players
Fresno Falcons players
Ice hockey people from Manitoba
Jacksonville Barracudas (WHA2) players
Kalamazoo Wings (1974–2000) players
Medicine Hat Tigers players
Michigan State Spartans men's ice hockey players
Minnesota North Stars draft picks
Minnesota North Stars players
Sportspeople from Selkirk, Manitoba
Pittsburgh Penguins players
San Jose Sharks players
Selkirk Steelers players
Tulsa Oilers (1992–present) players
Winnipeg Jets (1979–1996) players